The HTC Corporation is a Taiwanese manufacturer of handheld devices.

HTC may also refer to:

Organizations

Companies
 Harrisonville Telephone Company, a telephone company in Waterloo, Illinois, US
 Horry Telephone Cooperative, Horry County, South Carolina, US
 High Tech Campus Eindhoven, Netherlands

Colleges
 Hangzhou Teachers College, in Hangzhou, China
 Harrogate Tutorial College, in Harrogate, North Yorkshire, England
 Hebrew Theological College, in Skokie, Illinois, US
 Hennepin Technical College, Minnesota, US
 Highland Theological College, in Dingwall, Highland, Scotland
 Holy Trinity College, Hong Kong
 Holy Trinity College, Philippines, in Puerto Princesa City, Palawan, Philippines
 Horndean Technology College, Hampshire, England

Science and technology
 Halley-type comet, a group of short-period comets
 Heat transfer coefficient, in thermodynamics
 High-temperature superconductor
 Hydrothermal carbonization, a process reducing biomass to carbon

Computing
 High-throughput computing, many computing resources over long periods of time to accomplish tasks
 HTML Components, a mechanism to implement components in script as Dynamic HTML

Transportation
 Harrisburg Transportation Center, a railway station in Harrisburg, Pennsylvania, US

Other uses
 Hanseatic Trade Center, an office complex in Hamburg, Germany

See also